American singer and songwriter Tori Kelly has released four studio albums, two extended plays, nineteen singles (including six as a featured artist), and two promotional singles. When she was 16, Kelly auditioned for the singing competition television series American Idol. After being eliminated from the show, Kelly began to work on her own music. In 2012, she independently released her first EP that she wrote, produced, and mixed herself, titled Handmade Songs by Tori Kelly. The following year, Scooter Braun became her manager and introduced her to Capitol Records, with whom she signed in September. Kelly's second EP Foreword came out in October 2013 as her first major label release. On June 23, 2015, Kelly's debut album, Unbreakable Smile, was released. The lead single, "Nobody Love", was released in the spring and became her first US Billboard Hot 100 appearance.

Studio albums

Extended plays

Singles

As lead artist

As featured artist

Promotional singles

Other charted songs

Guest appearances

Notes

References

Discographies of American artists
Pop music discographies